François Joseph Lefebvre (25 October 1755 – 14 September 1820), Duc de Dantzig, was a French military commander during the Revolutionary and Napoleonic Wars and one of the original eighteen Marshals of the Empire created by Napoleon.

Early life
Lefebvre was from Rouffach, Alsace, the son of a hussar. He enlisted in the French Army at the age of 17 and like his close friend, Michel Ordener, he embraced the French Revolution. In 1783 he married Cathérine Hübscher, with whom he had 14 children, although all predeceased him (his last son died in battle in 1812).

Revolutionary Wars
In 1789, Lefebvre was a sergeant in the Gardes Françaises. After its disbandment, he enlisted in the National Guard, where he received wounds protecting the Royal Family from an angry mob, after which he joined the revolution. Promoted to brigadier general in 1793, he took part in the Battle of Fleurus (24 June 1794). After General Louis Lazare Hoche's death he commanded the Army of Sambre-et-Meuse (September 1797). He then commanded the vanguard of the Army of the Danube under Jourdan in March 1799, although for the first week of the campaign he was incapacitated with ringworm and Dominique Vandamme replaced him temporarily. He was later injured at the Battle of Ostrach where the Advance Guard bore the brunt of the early fighting. In November 1799, Lefebvre commanded the Paris troops and agreed to support Napoleon Bonaparte in his coup d'état. In 1800, Bonaparte appointed him senator.

Napoleonic Wars
Napoleon made him a Marshal of the Empire in 1804. Lefebvre commanded a division of the Old Guard in the German campaign of 1805. At the Battle of Jena-Auerstedt, on 14 October 1806, Lefebvre commanded the infantry of the Imperial Guard. In command of the X Corps he besieged and took Danzig in 1807, which won him the title of Duc de Danzig (Duke of Danzig).

In 1808 Lefebvre took part in the Peninsular War. In 1809 he commanded the Bavarian Army at the battles of Eckmühl and Wagram. Defeated by Tyrolean patriot Andreas Hofer in the same year, he was replaced. He commanded the Old Guard in the French invasion of Russia, Battle of Borodino (1812), and in the German (1813) and French campaigns (1814) of the War of the Sixth Coalition.

He voted for the Emperor's deposition at the Senate and during the First Restoration he was made Peer of France by Louis XVIII (4 June 1814), but rallied to Napoleon during the Hundred Days.

After the war
He was excluded from the Chamber of Peers during the Second Restoration. However, he retained his rank of marshal. Louis XVIII restored his peerage on 5 March 1819. He died in 1820 and was buried near André Masséna at the Père-Lachaise Cemetery, Paris.

He never forgot the hard work that brought him rank and wealth. When a friend expressed envy of his estate, Lefebvre said, "Come down in the courtyard, and I'll have ten shots at you with a musket at 30 paces. If I miss, the whole estate is yours." After the friend declined this offer, Lefebvre added, "I had a thousand bullets shot at me from much closer range before I got all this."

In popular culture
Lefebvre is portrayed by Yves Montand in Sacha Guitry's 1955 film Napoléon.

In the 1931 anthology If It Had Happened Otherwise, the alternate history scenario "If the Moors in Spain Had Won" by Philip Guedalla has Napoleon appointing Lefebvre as King Youssef I of Granada after deposing the House of Boabdil, only to trigger an analog of the Peninsular War.

References

1755 births
1820 deaths
People from Rouffach
Dukes of Dantzig
Members of the Sénat conservateur
Members of the Chamber of Peers of the Bourbon Restoration
Members of the Chamber of Peers of the Hundred Days
Marshals of France
Military governors of Paris
French Republican military leaders of the French Revolutionary Wars
Marshals of the First French Empire
Burials at Père Lachaise Cemetery
Names inscribed under the Arc de Triomphe